Yakudza vicarius is a moth in the family Cossidae and the only species in the genus Yakudza. It was described by Francis Walker in 1865, and reclassified in 2006. It is found in China, Russia and Japan.

References

Natural History Museum Lepidoptera generic names catalog

Cossinae
Moths described in 1865